Leucanopsis nayapana is a moth of the family Erebidae. It was described by William Schaus in 1941. It is found in Brazil, Venezuela and Argentina.

References

nayapana
Moths described in 1941